"Do You Love Me?" is a song from the 1964 musical Fiddler on the Roof. It is performed by Tevye and his wife Golde.

Production
Chaim Topol explained:

Synopsis
Tevye and Golde's daughters choose men they love as marital partners. As they themselves had an arranged marriage, Tevye asks Golde if she actually loves him.

Southern Light Opera explains "‘Do You Love Me?’ sums up the confusion in Tevye's mind as times change".

Critical reception
Culture in Northern Ireland described it as "lovely". According to The Irish Times, "In an enchanting duet with his wife, Tevye philosophises about the existence of love in his own 25-year marriage – Do You Love Me is one of the most memorable songs of the evening and captures the vividness of Sheldon Harnick’s lyrics." Daily Breeze says "There’s no surprise at the end of the couple’s duet, “Do You Love Me?” when indeed she reveals her love." Seen and Heard names it "bittersweet". The Shuttle described it as "an inoffensive but adorable highlight". Talkin' Broadway notes one performance was "sweet, charming and completely realistic". Decent Films Guide called it "quietly bittersweet". Des Moines Register named it an "old-married-couple duet".

References

1964 songs
Songs from Fiddler on the Roof
Songs written by Sheldon Harnick
Songs written by Jerry Bock